Kent Andrew "Smallzy" Small (born 16 April 1984) is an Australian radio presenter on Nova FM.

Career
Small started his career at age 19 at Star 104.5 on the New South Wales Central Coast. After spending two and half years working with NOVA Entertainment, he moved to Nova 106.9 in Brisbane in 2007 to present their local night show with Michelle Anderson. The duo consistently enjoyed ratings wins and went on to be nominated Best On-Air Team at the 2008 Australian Commercial Radio

Kent currently hosts his own national show Smallzy's Surgery weeknights from 7pm-10pm slot on Nova FM stations around Australia. The show covers all things music and celebrity and has travelled internationally to get access to the biggest stars in the world. Smallzy's Surgery's success has been mirrored around the country, with the show consistently trending Australia wide on Twitter, as well as Worldwide.  Kent's success has also been recognized at the Australian Commercial Radio Award s winning Best Music/Entertainment Presenter in 2013, 2016 and 2017.

Small previously presented a weekly music news segment on The Loop and was a fill-in presenter whilst Scott Tweedie was away.

Kent is also a pop culture contributor on Weekend Today and The Morning Show.

Education
Kent attended Cranebrook High School in 1997–2000. He graduated from St Marys Senior High School in 2002. Also in 2002, Small studied at the Australian Film, Television & Radio School in Sydney, Australia graduating in 8 months.

References

External links
 Nova FM - Smallzy's Surgery
 Official Site
 Twitter: 

Australian radio presenters
Nova (radio network) announcers
1984 births
Living people
People from Sydney